Auglaize may refer to:

 Auglaize Township, Camden County, Missouri
 Auglaize Township, Laclede County, Missouri
 Auglaize River, tributary of the Maumee River in northwestern Ohio
 Auglaize County, Ohio
 Auglaize Township, Allen County, Ohio
 Auglaize Township, Paulding County, Ohio